Clear Lake Reservoir is a reservoir in the Klamath Basin and the Modoc National Forest, in northwestern Modoc County, California.

The reservoir is not to be confused with Clear Lake, a large natural lake on Cache Creek in Lake County, California.

Clear Lake Dam
The original dam was constructed of rockfill and completed in 1910. It was replaced with a concrete dam near the old dam in 2002. The old dam had deteriorated and the water level was kept low to prevent it from failing. Its crest is at the same height as the old dam and the reservoir's capacity is about the same. There is a small hydroelectric plant at the dam with a capacity of 3 MW. The dam is owned by the United States Bureau of Reclamation.

The dam and reservoir were created to reduce flows into the reclaimed wetlands of Tule Lake. It also reduces flows into Tule Lake Sumps in the Tule Lake National Wildlife Refuge.

The reservoir created by the dam has a very large surface area, 25,760 acres (104.2 km2), and its average depth at maximum capacity is only about 20 feet (6 m), so it has a very high rate of evaporation. In 1998,  of water from the reservoir evaporated, more than any other lake in the state besides Shasta Lake, which has over 8 times the volume. Because of this, Clear Lake Reservoir is not an efficient water storage reservoir. This is a problem since the dam now provides water for irrigation in the eastern half of the Klamath Basin.

The reservoir is in Modoc National Forest and Clear Lake National Wildlife Refuge, so recreation opportunities are limited.

See also
List of dams and reservoirs in California
List of largest reservoirs of California
List of lakes in California

References
California Department of Water Resources (XLS)
 
Herald News
United States Bureau of Reclamation

Reservoirs in Modoc County, California
Klamath River
Modoc Plateau
Modoc National Forest
Dams in California
Dams on the Klamath River
Reservoirs in Northern California
1910 establishments in California